Bellbird is a town and locality in the City of Cessnock in the Hunter Region of New South Wales, Australia. A memorial was built there in 1990 to remember the 21 deaths from the 1923 Bellbird Mining Disaster.

References 

Suburbs of City of Cessnock
Towns in the Hunter Region

Mining towns in New South Wales